Tiffin River Wildlife Area is a non-contiguous  State Wildlife Management Area on Ohio State Route 66 in western Fulton County, Ohio between Fayette, Ohio and Archbold, Ohio. Hunting is allowed, and the Ohio DNR has released pheasants for hunting in the area.  There is a parking lot off County Road 23.

Notes

External links 
Tiffin River Wildlife Area Ohiodnr.gov

Nature reserves in Ohio
Protected areas of Fulton County, Ohio
Tourist attractions in Fulton County, Ohio
Fulton County, Ohio